Iván José Mayta Apaza (born 1 March 1999) is a Peruvian footballer who plays as a goalkeeper for Alfonso Ugarte.

Club career

Deportivo Binacional
Mayta joined Deportivo Binacional in 2016 from Deportivo Municipal and was quickly promoted to the club's reserve team. In 2017, he began training with the first team. Helping Binacional to win the 2017 Copa Perú, 17-year old Mayta was promoted to the first team squad for the 2018 season. However, he wasn't able to break through and left the club at the end of the year.

Los Caimanes
On 27 March 2019 Peruvian Segunda División club, Los Caimanes, confirmed the signing of Mayta on a deal until the end of the season. He immediately became a regular starter for the club and played 20 games in total, with 46 conceded goals. Los Caimanes finished the season with an 11th place and was relegated to Copa Perú.

Cusco
Ahead of the 2020 season, Mayta joined Peruvian Primera División club Cusco FC. He got shirt number 12. In October 2020, he joined Unión Comercio on loan for the rest of the year. Mayta left Cusco at the end of 2020.

Deportivo Maristas
On 6 September 2021, Mayta joined Deportivo Maristas.

Sport Chavelines
In February 2022, Mayta moved to Peruvian Segunda División side Sport Chavelines.

International career
In March 2018, Mayta was called up to the Peruvian U20 national team after winning the 2017 Copa Perú with Deportivo Binacional. However, he never made his debut.

References

External links
 
 
 Iván Mayta at Cusco FC's website

Living people
1999 births
Association football goalkeepers
Peruvian footballers
Peruvian Segunda División players
Deportivo Municipal footballers
Deportivo Binacional FC players
Los Caimanes footballers
Cusco FC footballers
Unión Comercio footballers
Alfonso Ugarte de Puno players
People from Arequipa